An election to the Neath Rural District Council in West Glamorgan, Wales was held in May 1952. It was preceded by the 1949 election, and followed by the 1955 election.

Overview of the results
The election resulted in relatively few changes in personnel as Labour comfortably upheld the majority it had held on the council since 1934.

Boundary changes
The Blaenrhonddan Ward, which had hitherto elected three members, was divided into three single-member wards. The total number of seats on the authority remained the same at 29.

Candidates
The profile of candidates was similar to three years previously with a number of long-serving Labour councillors returned unopposed. These included the joint 'fathers of the council', William Jones and J.T. Evans. At the new Cilfrew Ward, Albert Davies, who lost his seat three years previously, was returned unopposed.

Outcome
Labour maintained in full control of the authority. The Communists lost one of their two seats at Skewen, as Alun Thomas who had in 1946 been elected both to Neath Rural and the Glamorgan County Council lost his seat.

Ward results

Baglan Higher (one seat)

Blaengwrach (one seats)

Blaenrhonddan, Bryncoch Ward (one seat)

Blaenrhonddan, Cadoxton Ward (one seat)

Blaenrhonddan, Cilfrew Ward (one seat)

Clyne (one seats)

Coedffranc (five seats)

Dyffryn Clydach (two seats)

Dulais Higher, Crynant Ward (one seat)

Dulais Higher, Onllwyn Ward (one seat)

Dulais Higher, Seven Sisters Ward (two seats)

Dulais Lower (one seat)

Michaelstone Higher (one seat)

Neath Higher (three seats)

Neath Lower (one seat)

Resolven, Cwmgwrach Ward (one seat)

Resolven, Resolven Ward (two seats)

Resolven, Rhigos Ward (two seats)

Resolven, Tonna Ward (one seat)

References

1952 Welsh local elections